Rollinia chrysocarpa is a species of tree in the Annonaceae family. It is found in Peru and possibly Ecuador.

References

chrysocarpa
Vulnerable flora of South America
Taxonomy articles created by Polbot

Trees of Peru
Taxobox binomials not recognized by IUCN